Stordal is the administrative centre of Fjord Municipality in Møre og Romsdal county, Norway. The village is located on the eastern shore of the Storfjorden at the mouth of the river Stordalselva.

The main church for the municipality, Stordal Church is located in this village. The Old Stordal Church, now a museum, is also located here.

References

Villages in Møre og Romsdal
Fjord (municipality)